Saugat Malla (Nepali: सौगत मल्ल) is a Nepalese film actor and producer. He began acting professionally in 2008 and became known for his leading role as Haku Kale in Loot (2012). Other work includes Mukhauta (2014), Sadanga (2015), Soongava: Dance of the Orchids (2012), Lappan Chhappan (2017), Kabaddi Kabaddi (2015), and Fateko Jutta (2017).

Career

Early career 
Saugat Malla started acting at Aarohan Gurukul (Nepals first drama school), appearing in several critically acclaimed productions including Oedipus Rex and Agni Ko Katha at Gurukul Theater.

Malla made his film debut in Kagbeni (2008), directed by Bhusan Dahal and featuring Deeya Maskey, Nima Rumba and Hanif Mohammed; then in K Yo Maya Ho (2011). He had to wait four years before being signed in Nischal Basnet's Loot (2012). The film became one of the most successful films in Nepal, and he came to be identified as the bank robbing Haku Kale, the character he played in the film. Several other Nepalese films including Soongava: Dance of the Orchids (2012), Kathaa (2013), Sourya (2013), Badhshala (2013), Shree 5 Ambare (2014), Utsav (2014), Mukhauta (2014) and Sadanga (2015) soon followed.

Commercial success (2015–present) 
In 2015 Malla starred in the romantic-comedy Kabaddi Kabaddi (2015), directed by Ram Babu Gurung and featuring Dayahang Rai, Rishma Gurung and Priyanka Karki, which became one of the highest grossing Nepalese films of 2015, in the role of Bam Kaji who returns to his home village, falls in love with the female lead, but must compete for her affections with a rival. After the release of Kabaddi Kabaddi (2015) Malla was regarded as important in cinema of Nepal history.  Then he appeared in Dying Candle (2016), directed by Naresh Kumar Kc, in which he starred alongside Srijana Subba, Arpan Thapa, and Lakpa Singi Tamang, which wasn't strong at the box office. Then he starred in Fanko (2016) with Dayahang Rai, Priyanka Karki, and Keki Adhikari, in the role of a bank worker who is kidnapped by thieves.

In 2017 he starred in crime film Loot 2, directed by Nischal Basnet. Although his performance was praised, the film was criticized as inferior to the original Loot. In Fateko Jutta, a romance directed by Nikesh Khadka, he acted alongside Priyanka Karki and Kameshwor Chaurasiya. The film did not do well at the box office, but the audience praised the chemistry between Malla and Priyanka Karki. More recently, Malla appears in romantic films including Jhyanakuti (2017) and Mero Paisa Khoi (2017). Jhyanakuti was successful at the box office but Mero Paisa Khoi flopped after competing with another highly successful film, Chhakka Panja 2.

In January 2018, Malla appeared in an episode of the reality show webseries Artists Support Programme—Fashion Artist Edition.

Personal life
Malla is in a relationship with Shristi Shrestha.

Filmography

References

External links
 

Living people
21st-century Nepalese male actors
People from Nawalparasi District
Nepalese male film actors
Nepalese businesspeople
Nepalese film producers
21st-century Nepalese male singers
Nepalese male dancers
Nepalese male stage actors
1984 births
21st-century Nepalese dancers